Andrew Michael Gilbert-Scott (born 11 July 1958) is a former British racing driver.

Early career 
He started his racing career in the Formula Ford British championship in 1981. In 1983, he moved to the Lola Formula Ford works team. Gilbert-Scott was successful, winning the RAC and Townsend Thoresen Championships.

Career in Europe 
In 1986, he stepped up into Formula Three, and ran for the Chuck McCarthy Racing team, finishing 11th overall. In 1987, he competed in some races in the FIA International Formula 3000 championship, and also entered sports car racing series such as the World Sportscar Championship and the All Japan Sports Prototype Championship.

Disappointed with his lack of progress in Europe, Gilbert-Scott tried to move to Japan in 1988. In this year, he competed in the All-Japan Formula Three Championship and the All Japan Sports Prototype Championship.

In 1989, he had further successes in the British Formula 3000 series for the Eddie Jordan Racing team, finishing second overall. He also raced in International Formula 3000 for GA Motorsports. He raced at the 24 Hours of Le Mans as part of the Silk Cut Jaguar team in the Jaguar XJR-9 LM.

In the next two years, Gilbert-Scott continued his competition in the International Formula 3000 championship. He raced for Leyton House Racing in the 1990 season, and made a few appearances for the Roni Motorsport team in the 1991 season. But he did not score any notable results.

Move to Japan 
In 1992, he returned to Japan, competing in the All Japan Formula 3000 Championship for the Stellar International racing team, and also drove their BMW M3 car in the All Japan Touring Car Championship. He competed in the same environment until 1997, and also competed in the early years of the Formula Nippon championship, started in 1996. He therefore became a well-known name for Japanese race fans.

In 1997, his last year as a professional racecar driver, he also raced at the 24 Hours of Le Mans for the GTC Racing team (Gulf Team Davidoff) and drove a McLaren F1 GTR.

After his race driver career 
In 1998, he drove a Jordan Grand Prix Formula One car down the Hangar Straight of Silverstone Circuit in a drag race, competing against a Ferrari F40 road car, as a feature for Top Gear, a BBC television motoring show. He has raced Jordan Grand Prix cars on various other occasions, including again at Silverstone Circuit in 2001. He managed racing driver Takuma Sato from 2001 until 2009.

Personal life 
He is related to Thomas Scott, rector of Aston Sandford, Buckinghamshire, who wrote the first commentary on the English Bible. He is also a second cousin of Angus William Thomas Gilbert Scott, a world record ultralight aviator, currently living in Hong Kong. He is also descended from the distinguished architects Sir Giles Gilbert Scott and Sir George Gilbert Scott. His mother's side of the family own the Morgan Car Company.

Racing record

Japanese Top Formula Championship results
(key) (Races in bold indicate pole position) (Races in italics indicate fastest lap)

Complete British Touring Car Championship results
(key) (Races in bold indicate pole position in class) (Races in italics indicate fastest lap in class - 1 point awarded all races)

‡ Endurance driver.

Complete Japanese Touring Car Championship results
(key) (Races in bold indicate pole position) (Races in italics indicate fastest lap)

24 Hours of Le Mans results

References

Sources 
Historic racing drivers site

1958 births
Living people
English racing drivers
International Formula 3000 drivers
British Formula 3000 Championship drivers
Japanese Formula 3000 Championship drivers
Formula Nippon drivers
British Formula Three Championship drivers
Japanese Formula 3 Championship drivers
Formula Ford drivers
24 Hours of Le Mans drivers
Japanese Touring Car Championship drivers
People from Cookham
British Touring Car Championship drivers
World Sportscar Championship drivers
Nismo drivers
24H Series drivers